A.S.D. Orlandina Calcio is an Italian football club based in Capo d'Orlando, Sicily. Currently it plays in the amateur Prima Categoria league.

History

Foundation 
The club was founded in 1951.

Serie D 
In the season 2012–13 the team was promoted for the first time, from Eccellenza Sicily/B to Serie D. The club disbanded after that lone season, and restarted from Prima Categoria afterwards.

Colors and badge 
The team's colors are blue and white.

References

Football clubs in Italy
Association football clubs established in 1951
Football clubs in Sicily
1951 establishments in Italy